Cady Noland (born 1956) is an American postmodern conceptual sculptor and an internationally exhibited installation artist whose work deals with the failed promise of the American Dream and the divide between fame and anonymity, among other themes. Her work has been exhibited in museums and expositions including the Whitney Biennial in 1991 and Documenta 9 in Kassel, Germany. Noland is known for her reticence to be publicly identified, having only ever allowed one photograph of herself to be publicly released, and for her numerous disputes and lawsuits with museums, galleries, and collectors over their handling of her work. She attended Sarah Lawrence College and is the daughter of the Color Field painter Kenneth Noland.

Style and themes
Noland's work often explores what she calls "The American Nightmare," or aspects of American culture she considers toxic, such as social climbing, glamour, celebrity, violence, and death. She describes these social constructs as a "game." Noland's work has dealt with themes of restrictions, both physical and mental, often using metal in her work to evoke senses of joining or separating.

Noland's central theme in her work retains fear, both personal and cultural. Crashed Car was brought upon by the fact that she was in a car wreck at a very young age. In Plane Crash she emphasizes her fear of flying. The Family and the SLA that kidnapped Hearst is based on her fear of cults. Her later works have been said to be less aggressive and more friendly to viewers, and more stable and grounded.

Noland's work also studies the American social landscape and shows America's social identity to be in fragments. On top of that, she makes sculptures that are prompted by the theme of humiliation that in part lives in the American consciousness. It is all in relation to the institution, containment and mobility, and to the American way of life.

Patty Hearst and her grandfather, newspaper magnate William Randolph Hearst, have both been recurring figures in Noland's work. Noland has used Patty's story as a kidnapping victim who would later join her kidnappers - the Symbionese Liberation Army - in several high-profile crimes, as well as her grandfather's role as an architect of the contemporary American media landscape, to explore themes of propaganda, brainwashing, and psychopathy.

Noland's arrangement of objects have casualness that call into question the status of the art object and its artistic position, and her works are often composed of assembled found objects. Like other fellow artists, such as Mike Scott and Laurie Parsons, Cady Noland's paintings resist interpretation. Appropriated by Noland, the role of the press photograph expanded in a post-war country that was understanding and exporting itself through images. She is known for reframing the photo that she appropriates through the materiality of the image itself. It is then transferred by silkscreen from source to surface. According to Noland, to reproduce the image is to insert it into a category of knowledge and understanding. One that is transformed by way of a continuous return.

Objectification Process (1989) features a rolled-up flag placed on an orthopedic walker. Noland's incorporation of walkers, canes, police barricades, and fences work to convey themes of immobility, containment, confinement, and violence.

This Piece Has No Title Yet (1989), one of Noland's most well-known works, is a room-sized installation composed of over 1000 six-packs of Budweiser beer stacked behind metal scaffolding. Curator and dealer Jeffrey Deitch called the work "her masterpiece, her greatest work."

In her work, Not Yet Titled (Bald Manson Girls Sit-In Demonstration) (1993–1994), Noland changes both the image and the text. It is a wire photo capturing four of the young women from the Manson family kneeling on a sidewalk.

Relationship with art market
Noland set the record for the highest price ever paid for an artwork by a living woman ($6.6 million), for her 1989 work Oozewald sold at Sotheby's. In the fall of 2012 the same auction house, Sotheby's, removed her aluminum print Cowboys Milking (1990) from a contemporary sale after the artist "disavowed" the work. Both Noland and the auction house were later sued by the piece's owner, gallerist Marc Jancou, for twenty six million dollars (with twenty million having been sought from Noland and six from Sotheby's). In November 2012 a judge dismissed Jancou's lawsuit.

Noland's 1989 red silkscreen on aluminum of Lee Harvey Oswald, titled Bluewald, sold for $9.8 million at Christie's in May 2015, setting a new auction record for the artist.

In June 2015, the Ohio collector Scott Mueller filed a lawsuit at the United States District Court for the Southern District of New York seeking to reverse his 2014 purchase of Noland's sculpture Log Cabin (1990) for $1.4 million; he claimed that Nolan had "disavowed" the work by not approving the extensive restoration of the piece. The artist disavowed her sculpture, following its sale to Mueller, because she believed the work had been restored "beyond recognition." This restoration occurred following a long-term loan to Suermondt-Ludwig-Museum in Aachen, Germany, where the condition of the logs had deteriorated from 10 years of outdoor exposure. A conservator was consulted and hired to complete the restoration in Germany, where all of the decayed wood was replaced with logs obtained from the same Montana source as the original sculpture. The artist, who believes she should have been consulted about this, felt the extensively restored piece was essentially recreated, and therefore, it was now an unauthorized copy of the original, violating her copyright protections as outlined in the Visual Artists Rights Act, a 1990 addition to the US Copyright law.

Since the disavowal in 2016, the artist has been involved in complicated legal battles regarding the restoration of Log Cabin and the application of the copyright laws pertaining to the materials used in her sculpture, German vs. US laws, and her rights to copyright as a living contemporary artist. A lawsuit was dismissed in June 2020 by a New York district court judge, who ruled that Noland's rights had not been violated.

Several critics have suggested that Noland's legal disputes surrounding the sale, restoration, and treatment of various works, along with her longtime self-imposed distance from the traditional gallery ecosystem, are themselves a form of artistic statement and communication. Writing for T: The New York Times Style Magazine, Zoë Lescaze posited, "She has become known as the art world’s boogeyman, but she might be its conscience."

Exhibition history
The artist's first solo exhibition took place in 1989 at Colin de Land's American Fine Arts gallery in New York.

Noland's major exhibitions include: Whitney Biennial, New York (1991); Strange Abstraction with Robert Gober, Philip Taaffe, and Christopher Wool, Touko Museum of Contemporary Art, Tokyo (1991); Paula Cooper Gallery, New York (1994); Museum Boijmans Van Beuningen, Rotterdam (1995); Wadsworth Atheneum, Hartford, Connecticut (1996);  Documenta 9, Kassel (1992); MONO: Olivier Mosset, Cady Noland, Migros Museum of Contemporary Art, Zurich (1999); Cady Noland: The American Dream, Frans Hals Museum - Hal, Haarlem (2010–11); and Cady Noland (2018-2019), an extensive survey of the artist's work at Museum of Modern Art, MMK in Frankfurt.

The American Dream (2010–2011) was an exhibition of assemblages and silkscreens that showed Noland's practice from 1989 to 1995, the year of her last solo presentation in the Netherlands at Rotterdam's Museum Boijmans Van Beuningen.

Noland's first solo gallery show in the United States in over two decades, The Clip-On Method, opened at Galerie Buchholz in New York in 2021 and was accompanied by the publication of a two-volume artist's book of the same.

Notable works in public collections

Cart Full of Action (1986), Art Gallery of Ontario, Toronto
The American Trip (1988), Museum of Modern Art, New York 
The Big Slide (1989), Art Institute of Chicago
Booth - The Big Plunge (1989), Stedelijk Museum voor Actuele Kunst, Ghent, Belgium
Celebrity Trash Spill (1989), Kunstmuseum Liechtenstein, Vaduz
Deep Social Space (1989), Museum Brandhorst, Munich
Frame Device (1989), Hammer Museum, Los Angeles
Objectification Process (1989), Institute of Contemporary Art, Boston
Oozewald (1989), Glenstone, Potomac, Maryland; and Museum of Contemporary Art, Antwerp, Belgium
Tanya as a Bandit (1989), Museum Brandhorst, Munich; Museum of Modern Art, New York; and Whitney Museum, New York
This Piece Has No Title Yet (1989), Rubell Museum, Miami
Untitled (1989), Baltimore Museum of Art
Untitled (1989), Institute of Contemporary Art, Boston
Bluewald (1989-1990), Wadsworth Atheneum, Hartford, Connecticut
Awning Blanks (1990), Stedelijk Museum voor Actuele Kunst, Ghent, Belgium
Chainsaw Cut Cowboy Head (1990), Museum of Contemporary Art, Chicago
Chainsaw Cut Cowboy with Baked Beans (1990), Museum Ludwig, Cologne
Dance Hall Doors (1990), San Francisco Museum of Modern Art
Enquirer Page with Eyes Cut Out (1990), San Francisco Museum of Modern Art
Misc. Spill (1990), Museum of Contemporary Art, Los Angeles 
Press Czar - telling the story of Randolph Hearst (1990), Stedelijk Museum voor Actuele Kunst, Ghent, Belgium
SLA Group Shot #4 (1990), Museum of Contemporary Art, Los Angeles; and Solomon R. Guggenheim Museum, New York
Pipe Soffit. (1992), Museum of Contemporary Art, Los Angeles
Mr. Sir (1993), The Broad, Los Angeles
Sham Death (1993-1994), The Broad, Los Angeles
Surrounded!!! (1993-1994), Wadsworth Atheneum, Hartford, Connecticut
Tower of Terror (1993-1994), Glenstone, Potomac, Maryland
Untitled Xerox Cut-Out (Squeaky Fromme/Gerald Ford) (1993-1994), Museum of Modern Art, New York
Walk and Stalk (1993-1994), San Francisco Museum of Modern Art
Joan, is there one law? (1994), Art Institute of Chicago
Publyck Sculpture (1994), Glenstone, Potomac, Maryland
Untitled (1994), Hamburger Kunsthalle, Hamburg, Germany
Untitled (Jacqueline Kennedy Onassis) (1994), Wadsworth Atheneum, Hartford, Connecticut
Untitled (1997-1998), Rose Art Museum, Waltham, Massachusetts
4 in One Sculpture (1998), Hessel Museum of Art, Annandale-on-Hudson, New York
Untitled (2008), Walker Art Center, Minneapolis

References

External links
 Frieze Magazine Review of her Paula Cooper Exhibition
 Noland, Cady, “Towards a Metalanguage of E V I L", Balcon No. 4, 1989

1956 births
Living people
American conceptual artists
Women conceptual artists
Postmodern artists
Sculptors from New York (state)
Sarah Lawrence College alumni
American women sculptors
American installation artists
20th-century American women artists
Artists from Washington, D.C.
21st-century American women artists